The Owen E. LeFevre House is a historic home in Denver, Colorado. It was built prior to 1896, when it became the home of Owen E. Levre. At that time it had a carriage entrance gate from 13th Street to the southwest of the house. It was listed on the National Register of Historic Places on August 13, 1976.

Colonel Charles E. Taylor
Built in 1893, architects Kirchner & Kirchner, for Colonel Charles E. Taylor, at a cost of $45,000, the Owen LeFevre House is on the border of the Cheesman Park and Congress Park neighborhoods. It had a wrap-around porch that ran the full length of the south and east sides of the home.

Levre family
Owen E. LeFevre (August 6, 1848–1921) was a lawyer from Dayton, Ohio before coming to Denver in 1873. He was elected the Attorney for Highland in 1875 and 1876 and served two terms as the town's mayor beginning in 1885. He was elected Judge of the county court in 1892 and two years later was elected a Judge of the Second judicial
District—Arapahoe County. 

LeFevre married Eva French (1852–1948), a graduate of Ohio Wesleyan University, in 1871 and they had a daughter, Fredrica, who was born in 1884. They moved into the York Street house in 1896. It had one of the best libraries in Denver and modern French paintings. It was the "center of art, literature, and music." Eva was on the boards of St. Luke's Hospital, Denver Orphan's Home, and Wolcott School for Girls. She was also a member of artists, literary, and press clubs.

York Street Club
After Eva LeFevre's death the house was sold for $25,000, a nominal price, to York Street #1, a local group of Alcoholics Anonymous. Over $220,000 from State Historic Funds had been spent to restore it. The LeFevre's house is now the York Street Club.

References

External links
 York Street Club

		
National Register of Historic Places in Denver
Victorian architecture in Colorado
Romanesque Revival architecture in Colorado
Houses completed in 1896